= Oro Verde =

Coordinates: 31°49′S 60°31′W

- Municipality and village
- Interactive map of Oro Verde
- Country: Argentina
- Province: Entre Ríos Province
- Time zone: UTC−3 (ART)

Oro Verde is a village and municipality in Entre Ríos Province in north-eastern Argentina.
